Robert Armistead Bryan (April 26, 1926 – December 27, 2017) was an American former university professor, administrator and university president.  Bryan was a native of Pennsylvania, and earned his bachelor's, master's and doctorate degrees. He subsequently obtained an appointment as a professor of English literature.  He was a long-time professor and academic administrator at the University of Florida, and was appointed as the university's interim president, serving from 1989 to 1990.  Bryan also served as the interim president of the University of Central Florida from 1991 to 1992, and the interim president of the University of South Florida from 1993 to 1994.

Early life
Bryan was born in Lebanon, Pennsylvania, on April 26, 1926.  He graduated with a Bachelor of Arts degree in English from the University of Miami and a Master of Arts and Doctor of Philosophy in English from the University of Kentucky.

Career
He was an English professor who specialized in sixteenth and seventeenth-century English literature.  He taught at the University of Florida in Gainesville, Florida, beginning in 1957, with short-term teaching assignments at Florida Southern College in Lakeland and Florida Atlantic University in Boca Raton.  In each instance, Bryan returned to the faculty of the University of Florida.

Before accepting the professorship at Florida in 1957, Bryan served as a ship's officer in the U.S. Merchant Marine, as a special agent in U.S. Army Counter-intelligence, and as a lecturer in English literature at the University of California's Extension Division in Tokyo, Japan and the University of Kentucky.

Bryan began his administrative career by becoming the assistant to the dean of the University of Florida Graduate School in 1961.  A year later, as an associate professor, he became director of Florida's Ford Foundation.  In 1969, he was appointed dean of advanced studies and director of research at Florida Atlantic University.  In 1970, he returned to the University of Florida, and was appointed dean of faculties.  He was promoted to associate vice-president for academic affairs in 1971, and became the vice-president of academic affairs in 1975.  In 1985, he became university provost as well, and served in that capacity until his appointment as interim president.

When president Marshall Criser retired in 1989, Bryan served as the acting president of the University of Florida from 1989 to 1990.  As a long-time vice-president of the university administration, he immediately placed his own stamp on it.  During his twelve months as the university's interim president, Bryan became enmeshed in high-profile controversies involving NCAA violations by two of Florida's sports coaches.  He was responsible for the forced resignation of Florida Gators football coach Galen Hall in September 1989, following alleged NCAA rules infractions by Hall and the football staff, and, together with athletic director Bill Arnsparger, for hiring Heisman trophy-winning Florida alumnus Steve Spurrier as the new head coach of the Gators football team in December 1989.  Only weeks after Bryan was responsible for Hall's forced resignation, he also demanded the resignation of Gators basketball head coach Norm Sloan for unrelated NCAA violations; Sloan was replaced by interim coach Don DeVoe.  The Florida Board of Regents publicly credited Bryan with making difficult, but decisive decisions to preserve the integrity of the university.

Bryan was recalled from retirement in 1991, when the Board of Regents asked him to serve as the interim president of the University of Central Florida in Orlando.  He was credited with creating the new UCF satellite campus in downtown Orlando.

Having developed a reputation as a capable university administrator, he was asked to serve as the interim president of the University of South Florida in Tampa from 1993 to 1994—the third time he served as interim president of a major state university.  During his term at South Florida, Bryan took the step of requiring significantly greater financial commitments from the athletic department, boosters and alumni before the university's new South Florida Bulls football program began intercollegiate play.

In addition to his work as a professor and university administrator, Bryan also served as the president of the Florida Association of Colleges, as a consultant for the Southern Association of Colleges and Schools, and was the author of numerous books, journal articles and reviews.

Personal
Bryan was married to the former Kathryn Elizabeth Williams; they had two children, Lyla Bryan King and Matthew Bryan. His wife died in 2007. Bryan lived in Gainesville, Florida. He died on December 27, 2017, at the age of 91.

See also 

 Florida Gators
 Florida Opportunity Scholars Program
 History of the University of Florida
 List of Florida Atlantic University faculty
 List of presidents of the University of Central Florida
 List of University of Florida faculty and administrators
 List of University of Florida presidents
 List of University of Kentucky alumni
 List of University of Miami alumni
 List of University of South Florida presidents
 State University System of Florida

References

Bibliography 

 Greenberg, Mark I.,  University of South Florida: The First Fifty Years, 1956-2006, University of South Florida, Tampa, Florida (2006).
 Pleasants, Julian M., Gator Tales: An Oral History of the University of Florida, University of Florida, Gainesville, Florida (2006).  .
 Van Ness, Carl, & Kevin McCarthy, Honoring the Past, Shaping the Future: The University of Florida, 1853–2003, University of Florida, Gainesville, Florida (2003).

External links 
 University of Central Florida – Official website of the University of Central Florida.
 University of Florida – Official website of the University of Florida.
 University of South Florida – Official website of the University of South Florida.

1926 births
2017 deaths
American academics of English literature
Florida Atlantic University faculty
People from Lebanon, Pennsylvania
Presidents of the University of Central Florida
Presidents of the University of Florida
Presidents of the University of South Florida
University of Florida faculty
University of Kentucky alumni
University of Miami alumni
Journalists from Pennsylvania